Oksana Vasyakina (Russian: Оксана Юрьевна Васякина; born 18 December 1989) is a Russian poet, artist, curator, and feminist activist.

Biography

Born on 18 December 1989 in the city of Ust-Ilimsk, Irkutsk in a working-class family. She wrote her first poetic text at the age of 14. In 2016 she graduated from the poetry department of the Maxim Gorky Literature Institute. Participant of poetry festivals and slams in Novosibirsk, Perm, Vladimir, Moscow. Her work has been published in the journal "air", newspaper "YSHSHOODNA", Internet media "Snob", Colta.ru, "TextOnly", and "Halftoning".

The first book of poems "Women's Prose" was published in 2016. In 2017, she wrote a cycle of poetic texts "Wind of Fury", published by the AST publishing house in 2019 (series "Female Voice").

References

Russian poets
1989 births
Living people
Russian LGBT rights activists
Maxim Gorky Literature Institute alumni
Russian feminists